Harwich Lifeboat Station is a Royal National Lifeboat Institution (RNLI) station located in the town of Harwich in the English county of Essex. The station is positioned on the southern side at the mouth of the River Orwell estuary. The station serves a particularly busy section of coastline with Harwich being a very busy ferry terminal. Across the estuary is the Port of Felixstowe which is the United Kingdom's busiest container port.

History

1821: first station 
The first lifeboat at Harwich was called Braybrooke, and it was first stationed there in 1821. It was named in honour of Richard Griffin, 2nd Baron Braybrooke, Lord Lieutenant of Essex. The lifeboat was financed by the Essex Lifeboat Association, but no funds were available for a boathouse, so the Braybrooke was moored in the harbour. On the Suffolk side of the estuary at Landguard Fort there was a second lifeboat, the Orwell, which was eventually sold and converted to a yacht. The Harwich lifeboat had ceased operations by 1825, and the Braybrooke's fate is unknown.

1875–1917: second station and closure 
After the passenger steamship SS Deutschland was wrecked on Kentish Knock on 6 December 1875, it was decided that another lifeboat was needed at Harwich. A new boathouse was built at Timberfields in 1876 and a lifeboat called Springwell arrived in January 1876. The New lifeboat was 35 feet long by 9 feet wide and was self-righting. The Springwell remained at Harwich from 1876 until 1881 and was credited with saving the lives of 61 people, 23 of which had been saved during the launch to the barque Pasithea of Liverpool on 16 February 1883.

In 1889 the RNLI obtained its first steam-powered lifeboat, the Duke of Northumberland (ON 231), which was sent to Harwich in 1890. The station with Springwell became known as Harwich No. 1 station, whilst the mooring near Halfpenny Pier where the Duke of Northumberland was kept afloat became the No. 2 station. In 1892, the Duke of Northumberland was sent to New Brighton on Merseyside. It was replaced in 1894 by another steam lifeboat, the City of Glasgow (ON 362).

In 1902 the No. 1 station lifeboat Springwell (ON 317), the second boat to bear that name, was scrapped. In 1904 station No. 1 was given another Watson-class lifeboat, Ann Fawcett (ON 517). In the years leading up to World War I, Harwich was used for the testing of new motor lifeboats which were sent to other stations. In 1912 the Ann Fawcett was withdrawn from service once again leaving the City of Glasgow the only lifeboat on station.

By the breakout of the First World War in 1914, the City of Glasgow (ON 446), the second to bear this name, was the only lifeboat at Harwich. In 1917 the Admiralty commandeered the lifeboat for patrol duties. Harwich Lifeboat Station was closed, leaving the area to be covered by Aldeburgh Lifeboat Station to the north and Walton Lifeboat Station to the south.

1960s–1980: reopening and European Gateway incident 
Harwich Lifeboat Station did not reopen until 1965, when increased traffic to the Harwich ferry as well as the Port of Felixstowe across the estuary necessitated more lifeboats in the area. A 16 ft inshore inflatable lifeboat boat was stationed for the summers of 1965 and 1966. In September 1967, a 44 ft Waveney-class lifeboat, Margaret Graham (ON 1004), was sent to Harwich. After a successful two-year trial period, the Margaret Graham was made a permanent fixture at Harwich, where she remained until being replaced by the John Fison (ON 1060) in 1980.

The most notable incident attended by a Harwich station lifeboat was the European Gateway incident of 19 December 1982. The roll-on roll-off car ferry European Gateway was leaving Felixstowe for Zeebrugge when it collided with the train ferry Speedlink Vanguard approaching Harwich Harbour. The bow of the Speedlink Vanguard struck the European Gateway amidship, and she quickly capsized to the point where only half the starboard side of the vessel was above the water. Numerous lifeboats and tugs responded to the scene and began rescuing passengers from the European Gateway within minutes. The Speedlink Vanguard launched her own lifeboat to assist. Within an hour all passengers but six had been rescued. By the time the John Fison arrived, all that remained was to search for the bodies. The John Fison recovered two bodies, three others were located by other boats, and one remained unaccounted for.

1997–2003: new station 

In 1997, Harwich acquired the Albert Brown (ON 1202), a Severn-class, fast afloat boat built by Green Marine in 1995. She is 17 meters long, 5.5 meters wide with a depth of 1.38 meters, with a top speed of 25 knots and a range of 250 nautical miles. The Albert Brown was financed with bequest from Victoria Brown to commemorate her husband Albert Brown, and christened by Terry Waite CBE on 25 May 1997. 

In 2002, Harwich acquired the Sure and Steadfast (B789), an Atlantic 75-class second generation rigid inflatable boat (RIB). She was named on 18 May 2003 after the motto of the Boys' Brigade in recognition of the fund raising efforts for the RNLI by that organization.

In 2003, funds were secured for a new boathouse and facilities, at a cost of £1.25 million. , the Albert Brown and Sure and Steadfast remain in service at Harwich.

Fleet

No. 1 Station

No. 2 Station

Geographic location of neighbouring stations

References 

Lifeboat stations in Essex
Harwich